Pseudaristobia is a monotypic beetle genus in the family Cerambycidae described by Stephan von Breuning in 1943. Its only species, Pseudaristobia octofasciculata, was described by Per Olof Christopher Aurivillius in 1927.

References

Lamiini
Beetles described in 1927
Monotypic beetle genera